Portree High School is a state co-educational comprehensive school in Portree, Isle of Skye in Scotland. , the school enrols 490 pupils and employs 80 teachers and support staff. The school's catchment area draws from 15 primary schools across Skye and neighbouring Raasay. The school also has a hostel with boarding provisions for a small number of pupils who live in more remote areas of the island.

History
A school has existed at Portree since the 17th century. However it closed in 1825 due to the difficulty in finding a new qualified schoolmaster. Construction on the Portree High School buildings began in 1872. In 1905 it became a Higher Grade school. Margaret Carnegie Hostel for girls being opened in 1924, followed in 1933 by the Elgin Hostel for boys. Elgin Hostel is now a Category B listed building.

Until late 2008, the school consisted of three buildings - the main building, the Elgin Hostel and the Technical Block, along with about a dozen demountable classrooms. In 2008, this arrangement was replaced by a new building, constructed by Morrison Construction as part of a regional PPP scheme to build eleven schools in the Highlands. The demountable classrooms were then removed, and the main building and Technical Block demolished.

Curriculum
The school's curriculum includes provision for Gaelic medium education. Students take a range of curricular subjects in the Broad General Education (S1-S3) and a wide range of subjects at N4/5, Higher and AH level.  The school works in partnership with the West Highland College and Sabhal Mor Ostaig to offer a wide range of vocational subjects and Foundation Apprenticeships.  The new school was built in 2008, and officially opened in 2010.  The current Head Teacher, Tony Breen, was appointed in 2021.

Notable alumni 

 Sir Russell Johnston (1932–2008), Liberal Democrat politician, Leader of the Scottish Liberal Party 1974–1988
 Hector MacKenzie, Baron MacKenzie of Culkein (born 1940), nurse and trades unionist
Sorley Maclean, Scottish Gaelic poet and Nobel Prize nominee
 Roderick John MacLeod, Lord Minginish (born  1953), known as Roddy John, Chairman of the Scottish Land Court since 2014

See also

References

External links
 

Buildings and structures in the Isle of Skye
Category B listed buildings in Highland (council area)
Listed schools in Scotland
Secondary schools in Highland (council area)
Scottish Gaelic-language secondary schools
1872 establishments in Scotland
Educational institutions established in 1872
Portree